Veličani is a village in the municipality of Trebinje, Republika Srpska, southern Bosnia and Herzegovina. It is located in the Popovo field. The village is inhabited by ethnic Serbs, and home to the Church of St. Archangel Michael.

References

Villages in Republika Srpska
Populated places in Trebinje